Walter "Li'l Wally" Jagiello stage names Władysław Jagiełło, Li'l Wally, also Mały Władziu and Mały Władzio, which both mean "Li'l Wally" in Polish (August 1, 1930 – August 17, 2006) was a Polish American polka musician, songwriter and music arranger from Chicago, Illinois. He was a self-taught Chemnitzer concertina and drum player, who sang Polish as well as English in many of his songs. His most famous compositions include "Puka Jasiu (Johnny's Knocking)" and "I Wish I Was Single Again".  His song "Let's Go, Go-Go White Sox", as recorded by Captain Stubby and the Buccaneers underwent a resurgence in 2005.

Originally starting out at the age of 8 singing with the Eddie Zima Orchestra performing up and down "Polish Broadway," Division_Street_(Chicago) in Chicago, Wally soon struck out on his own and formed his own band "The Happy Harmony Boys". He was a pioneer in the concept of the independent record label, starting his own Jay-Jay Records in 1951 after a brief career recording stint on Columbia Records, at the age of twenty. He was renowned for his drumbeat and slower and more danceable tempo, which became a mainstay of "Chicago Style" Polish-American polka sound. His arrangements of many popular Polish folk tunes, and many originals as well, are those used today by polka bands all over the United States.  His nickname was derived from his short stature (5 foot 6 as an adult), especially during his youth, when he would stand on a picnic table to sing.

The highlight of Jagiello's career was performing for Pope John Paul II in 1984, who requested Wally continue playing after his initial song, "God Bless Our Polish Pope".  The pontiff blessed him after his performance, telling him "God will reward you for all your hard work."

He also appeared several times playing his concertina on The Lawrence Welk Show. He was one of the first two inductees into the International Polka Association's Hall of Fame in 1969. All total, he has collected 17 gold and 4 platinum records.

In his later years, he retired to Miami Beach, Florida, but continued to perform and record and please audiences nationwide. Li'l Wally died on August 17, 2006 in Florida at the age of 76. He was cremated.

Discography

Albums

Singles

References 
King of Chicago-style polka dies; co-wrote Sox fight song by Dave Hoekstra, The Chicago Sun-Times, August 22, 2006.
Walter "Li'l Wally" Jagiello: 1930 - 2006, by Trevor Jensen, The Chicago Tribune, August 23, 2006, Accessed August 24, 2006.

External links
Jay-Jay Records - Official site 
Jay-Jay on Myspace.com
International Polka Hall of Fame

1930 births
2006 deaths
American people of Polish descent
Polka musicians
Musicians from Chicago
Chemnitzer concertina players
20th-century American musicians
Songwriters from Illinois